Terry Deleon Killens (born March 24, 1974) is a former professional American football player who played linebacker for seven seasons in the National Football League (NFL) for the Houston Oilers/Tennessee Titans, the San Francisco 49ers, and the Seattle Seahawks. In 1999, the Titans made it to Super Bowl XXXIV in which Killens appeared as a substitute, however they lost to the Kurt Warner-led St. Louis Rams.

Killens has been a football official since at least 2013, working in the American Athletic Conference. , Killens was also an official in the Alliance of American Football, working as an umpire on the crew led by referee Tra Blake.

It was announced in April 2019 that Killens would be joining the NFL officiating staff for the 2019 season, and is wearing uniform number 77, which was previously worn by three-time Super Bowl referee Terry McAulay (and before that, Mike Pereira). Killens will work at the umpire position, as he did in the American Athletic Conference and Alliance of American Football.

References

1974 births
Living people
Players of American football from Cincinnati
American football linebackers
Penn State Nittany Lions football players
Houston Oilers players
Tennessee Oilers players
Tennessee Titans players
San Francisco 49ers players
Seattle Seahawks players
National Football League officials
African-American sports officials
21st-century African-American sportspeople
20th-century African-American sportspeople